Amadou Cissé (born in Nouakchott; died on 30 September 2017) was an Mauritanian international football player and manager.

References

2017 deaths
Mauritanian footballers
Mauritania international footballers
ASAC Concorde players
Association football defenders